Rip It Off may refer to:

 Rip It Off (Stroke 9 album)
 Rip It Off (Times New Viking album)
 Rip It Off also released as Beyond the City Limits, a 2001 heist film directed by Gigi Gaston

See also
 rip off (disambiguation)